Wellington railway station is located on the Main Western line in New South Wales, Australia. It serves the town of Wellington, opening on 1 June 1880 when the line was extended from Orange.

Gallery

Services
Wellington is served by NSW TrainLink's daily Central West XPT service operating between Sydney and Dubbo.

References

External links
Wellington station details Transport for New South Wales

Easy Access railway stations in New South Wales
Railway stations in Australia opened in 1880
Regional railway stations in New South Wales
Main Western railway line, New South Wales